Daniel Alexandru David (born 3 October 1983) is a Romanian former footballer who played as a centre back for FCM Bacău, Oțelul Galați, Gostaresh Foulad and FC Botoșani.

References

External links
 

1983 births
Living people
People from Buzău County
Romanian footballers
Association football defenders
Liga I players
Liga II players
FCM Bacău players
ASC Oțelul Galați players
FC Botoșani players
Azadegan League players
Gostaresh Foulad F.C. players
Romanian expatriate footballers
Romanian expatriate sportspeople in Iran
Expatriate footballers in Iran